KWSV-LP (99.1 FM, "99.1 The Ranch") is a low-power FM radio station licensed to and serving Simi Valley, California. The station is owned by Strategic Communications Group and broadcasts a country music format from its studios located inside Simi Valley Town Center. It is the flagship station of The Ashley & Brad Show, a syndicated country radio morning program co-hosted by former KZLA and KKGO personality Ashley Paige. KWSV-LP has one booster station, KWSV-LP-FM1 at 99.1 FM in neighboring Chatsworth.

History
The station first signed on on March 13, 2015 as "99.1 The Ranch" with a country music format. Since August 26, 2016, the station has also broadcast high school football games involving local teams under the banner of Ranch Friday Night Lights Game of the Week.

KWSV-LP is the originating station of The Ashley & Brad Show, a nationally syndicated weekday morning program targeted to listeners of country radio. The four-hour show is co-hosted by Ashley Paige, former on-air personality at Los Angeles country outlets KZLA and KKGO, and Brad Abrell, known for his work with WMMO in Orlando and WZTA in Miami.

KWSV-LP is the first low-power FM station in the United States to operate a booster station. In June 2017, the Federal Communications Commission granted the station a construction permit for a six-watt booster to improve reception in the San Fernando Valley. KWSV-LP-FM1, licensed to Chatsworth, California, signed on July 22, 2017 with a signal covering the northwest corner of the valley, an area served weakly by the primary signal. Boosters are used to fill in terrain-related gaps in signal coverage but not to extend coverage beyond the main station's signal contour. The call sign of the booster station is currently the longest call sign in United States broadcasting, at 9 characters.

References

External links

WSV-LP
Mass media in Ventura County, California
Simi Valley, California
Radio stations established in 2015
2015 establishments in California
Country radio stations in the United States